

Cynan Dindaethwy or Cynan ap Rhodri ("Cynan son of Rhodri") was a king of Gwynedd (reigned c. 798 – c. 816) in Wales in the Early Middle Ages. Cynan was the son of Rhodri Molwynog and ascended to the throne of Gwynedd upon the death of King Caradog ap Meirion in 798. His epithet refers to the commote of Dindaethwy in the cantref Rhosyr. Unlike later kings of Gwynedd, usually resident at Aberffraw in western Anglesey, Cynan maintained his court at Llanfaes on the southeastern coast. Cynan's reign was marked by a destructive dynastic power struggle with a rival named Hywel, usually supposed to be his brother.

There is no historical record of Cynan's early years as king, but his reign ended in a combination of natural disasters and military reverses. In 810, there was a bovine plague that killed many cattle throughout Wales. The next year Deganwy, the ancient wooden court of Maelgwn Gwynedd, was struck by lightning.

A destructive war between Cynan and Hywel raged on Anglesey between 812 and 816, ultimately ending with Cynan's defeat and banishment. Cynan and Hywel are said to be brothers in historical works such as Lloyd's History of Wales, although Lloyd does not cite its source. The Annals of Wales mention the pair only by name, without any title, relation, or patronym. (In comparison, it takes care to point out the brotherly nature of Elisedd's slaughter of Gruffydd ap Cyngen in Powys around the same time.) The genealogies from Jesus College MS 20 deny Cynan and Hywel were brothers at all, instead making Hywel the son of Caradog ap Meirion and a distant cousin of Cynan Dindaethwy son of Rhodri Molwynog. The Harleian genealogies agree with this. Cynan died within a year of his exile according to the Annals of Wales and the Irish Annals.

After Cynan's death, there was a battle at his former court at Llanfaes on Anglesey noted by the chronicles, but the combatants are not identified.

Cynan's daughter Esyllt became the mother of Merfyn Frych ap Gwriad, the first King of Gwynedd (825–844) known not to have descended from the male line of Cunedda.

See also
Kings of Wales family trees

Notes

References

Citations

Sources 

 

8th-century births
810s deaths
Year of birth unknown
Year of death uncertain
Monarchs of Gwynedd
8th-century Welsh monarchs
9th-century Welsh monarchs